The 2010–11 Oral Roberts Golden Eagles men's basketball team represented Oral Roberts University in the 2010–11 NCAA Division I men's basketball season. The Golden Eagles, led by head coach Scott Sutton, played their home games at the Mabee Center in Tulsa, Oklahoma, as members of The Summit League. The Golden Eagles finished 2nd in the Summit League during the regular season, and won two games in the Summit League tournament before losing in the championship game to regular-season Oakland.

Oral Roberts failed to qualify for the NCAA tournament, but were invited to the 2011 CIT. The Golden Eagles were eliminated in the first round of the CIT, losing to SMU, 64–57.

Roster 

Source

Schedule and results

|-
!colspan=9 style=|Exhibition

|-
!colspan=9 style=|Regular season

|-
!colspan=9 style=| Summit League tournament

|-
!colspan=9 style=| CollegeInsider.com tournament

Source

References

Oral Roberts Golden Eagles men's basketball seasons
Oral Roberts
Oral Roberts
Oral Roberts men's basketball
Oral Roberts men's basketball